Northern Pride Rugby League Football Club is a Queensland rugby league club founded in 2007. Based in Cairns, Queensland they compete in the QRL State competition, the Hostplus Cup, formerly the Wizard Queensland Cup. The club represents Far North Queensland.

History
The Northern Pride was one of two expansion teams for the 2008 season of the QRL Wizard Queensland Cup, along with the Mackay Cutters, against whom they played their debut game. Both teams are feeder clubs to the North Queensland Cowboys.

Cairns was represented in the QRL State Competition from 1996–2000 by the Cairns Cyclones, but a lack of support resulted in their withdrawal. Further representation in the competition was suggested in 2006 by a Cairns-based consortium of John O’Brien, Denis Keeffe, Nigel Tillet and John Moore, this time with the support of the North Queensland Cowboys and 9 of the 11 CDRL Clubs. The team name and logo were unveiled in July 2007 at a "Legends of Origin" lunch held at The Reef Hotel Casino.

The Club is a development club built around the phrase 'Born and Bred.' It was formed to create a regionally based talent development pathway for players, coaches and administrators. Prior to the creation of the Club, talented Far North Queensland rugby league players were invariably forced to move away from the region to go to schools and/or join southern based state league and national league clubs.

The Northern Pride competes in the Hostplus Super Cup, the Under-21 competition (Hastings Deering Colts), Under-19 female competition (Harvey Norman), Under-18 competition (Mal Meninga Cup) and Under-16 (Cyril Connell Cup).

Staff

Coach 
The original coach was Adrian Lam, who arrived in Cairns in August 2007, but was released a month later to take up a coaching position at the Sydney Roosters. He was replaced by former Canberra Raiders NRL player Andrew Dunemann (Coach 2008–2009) with former North Queensland Cowboys players David Maiden and Troy Cummings as Assistant Coaches.

Dunemann resigned at the end of 2009 and Maiden was promoted to Head Coach with former Canberra Raiders and PNG international David Westley as Assistant Coach. Maiden left at the end of 2012 season and was replaced by former Super League player Jason Demetriou as head coach with Ben Rauter as Assistant Coach.

Demetriou coached the Pride to a minor premiership in his first season, winning 17 of their 22 games and being awarded the 'Men of League Coach of the Year' award. In his second season Demetriou secured the minor premiership again, winning 20 games in 24 rounds, before taking out the premiership and the inaugural NRL State Championship. Demetriou resigned at the end of the 2014 season to take up the position of assistant coach under Paul Green at the North Queensland Cowboys. He was replaced by assistant coach Joe O'Callaghan, who coached the team during the 2015 and 2016 seasons with assistant coaches Shane O'Flanagan and Leon Hallie, and trainer Darren Ferricks.

Former North Queensland Cowboys and Queensland Origin winger Ty Williams was appointed coach in 2017, with assistant coaches Sam Obst and Shane O’Flanagan. Williams was named as QRL 'Coach of the Year' for the 2018 season. In 2019, Williams signed an extension which will see him coach until the end of the 2021 season. In November 2018, former Pride player Chey Bird was appointed Football Operations Manager. Bird was replaced in 2021 by Cameron Miller.

 Adrian Lam 2007
 Andrew Dunemann 2008-2009
 David Maiden 2009-2012
 Jason Demetriou 2013-2014
 Joe O'Callaghan 2015-2016
 Ty Williams 2017-present

Captain 
The foundation captain of the Northern Pride was former North Queensland Cowboys and St. George Illawarra Dragons player Chris Sheppard. He was the first player signed to the team in July 2007, and was captain and operations manager for the first three seasons. Sheppard retired after leading the Pride to the 2010 Queensland Cup premiership.

Former North Queensland Cowboys player Ty Williams was captain for the next three seasons (2011–2013), before retiring to captain-coach the CDRL Innisfail Leprechauns. In 2014 Brett Anderson and Jason Roos were named as joint co-captains.

Ryan Ghietti was named as captain in 2016, with Jack Svendsen as vice-captain. Ghietti retired at the end of the 2018 season and Tom Hancock and Dave Murphy were named as joint co-captains for the 2019 season. Javid Bowen was named captain for the 2020 Season, but only one round was played before the season was cancelled due to COVID-19. When matches restarted in 2021, Bowen re-signed with the Cowboys and Chris Ostwald and Jayden Hodges were named co-captains for the Pride.

CEO 
The foundation Chief Executive Officer was Dennis Keeffe, who held the position from 2007 to 2009. He was replaced in 2010 by QRL Northern Division chairman John Moore. From 2011 to 2013 former team captain Chris Sheppard was chief executive officer. In 2013-2014 Northern Pride business development manager, Brock Schaefer was CEO. Schaefer resigned at the end of the 2014 season to take up a role at South Sydney Rabbitohs, and was replaced by former Pride player Rod Jensen for the 2015 and 2016 seasons. Greg Dowling was CEO for the 2017 season, but resigned half-way through the 2018 season. He was replaced by Mark Quinn, who resigned at the end of the 2020 season.

Chairman and Board of Directors 
The founding Northern Pride chairman was John O'Brien. He was replaced by Bob Fowler who retired in December 2015. Terry Mackenroth acted as interim chairman until June 2016, when Cairns real-estate agent and club director, Tony Williamson, was appointed chairman.

The Northern Pride Board of Directors in 2019 is Tony Williamson (chair), Gail Andrejic, Colin Moore, Stephen Tillett, Peter Parr, Terry Medhurst and Stephen Devenish.

Venues

Barlow Park 
The Pride's home ground is Barlow Park in Cairns. The playing field is 114 metres long (100 metres of field plus two 7-metre in-goal areas) by 68 metres wide. The facility is floodlit for night games with four towers providing 620 lux. The venue has a capacity of 15,000, which includes 1,700 seats (mostly undercover) in a stand on the northern side of the park. The stand was constructed in 1987. The car park can accommodate approximately 300 vehicles. In 2012–2013 the Pride played 13 consecutive home games at Barlow Park without loss. In 2014 Barlow Park was renamed 'The Jungle' and the Pride won all 12 matches they played there.

Other venues 
The Pride have played two home games at Pride Oval (CDRL Kangaroo's Vico Oval) in 2010, and one home game at Davies Park, Mareeba in 2014.

As part of the Queensland Cup's Country Week initiative, the Northern Pride have hosted home games in Mount Isa, Yarrabah, Mareeba, Innisfail, Ravenshoe, Cooktown, Bamaga and Thursday Island.

Pride Oval and Pride Leagues Club 
The Pride purchased CDRL Kangaroos Leagues Club and Vico Oval, Irene Street, Mooroobool from the Redcliffe Dolphins in June 2008 for $1.85m (the Dolphins having purchased the Oval and Leagues Club from the Kangaroos in 2005 when the Roos were in financial difficulty). Vico Oval was renamed Pride Oval and the 2008 Northern Pride Player Awards ceremony was held at the Pride Leagues Club. Pre-Season Trials were played at Pride Oval in 2009, as well as Round 9 and Round 11 of the 2010 Season.

The Oval and Leagues Club cost around $230,000 a year to maintain, and so in December 2010 Cairns Regional Council agreed to purchase the sporting complex for $2.5m to guarantee its future as a sporting field, prevent residential development on the land and free the Northern Pride rugby league club from an oppressive debt. The Pride were given a six-month lease, and when it expired in May 2011 they decided not to renew and moved to Barlow Park. Pride Oval was leased to CDRL Kangaroos RLFC and became Vico Oval and Kangaroos Leagues Club once again. The Pride played a pre-season trial matches at Vico Oval in 2012 and 2016.

Seasons

2008 – Inaugural Season

In their first year in the Queensland Cup the Northern Pride came third, losing the preliminary final in golden point extra-time to the Souths Logan Magpies, who went on to win the 2008 grand final.

The foundation coach was Andrew Dunemann, who had played for the Canberra Raiders, Leeds Rhinos, Halifax and South Sydney Rabbitohs, and had been Under-20s coach for the Canberra Raiders. David Maiden was assistant coach.

The foundation captain was Chris Sheppard, who had played for the North Queensland Cowboys and St. George Illawarra Dragons.

2008 Ladder

2009 – Runners Up

The Northern Pride followed up their impressive first season by finishing second and reaching the grand final. The Pride's first grand final appearance ended in a 32–18 loss to the Sunshine Coast Sea Eagles at Stockland Park.

Coach Andrew Dunemann left at the end of the season to take up a position as assistant coach to Rick Stone at the Newcastle Knights.

2009 Ladder

2010 – Premiers

David Maiden took over as coach. Maiden played for the North Queensland Cowboys, Gateshead Thunder and Hull FC, as well as representing Scotland as an international in the 2000 Rugby League World Cup.

The Northern Pride finished fourth and made the Grand Final, having won 11 matches in a row. They won their first premiership, beating Norths Devils 30-20 at Suncorp Stadium. Captain Chris Sheppard won the Duncan Hall Medal for his man-of-the-match performance, which was his last game before retirement.
Grand Final video highlights.

2010 Ladder

2011 season

Between Round 14 of the 2010 season and Round 5 of the 2011 season, the Northern Pride won 17 consecutive games, a Queensland Cup record. After a draw in Round 6 and a win in Round 7, the Pride were unbeaten after 19 matches. The Pride finished the 2011 season in second place, but were eliminated after losing the semi-final 26-20 to Tweed Heads Seagulls at Dolphin Oval, Redcliffe.

2011 Ladder

2012 season

In 2012, the club finished seventh to miss out on a finals appearance for the first time in their short history. At the end of the season, coach David Maiden resigned, while fullback Chey Bird, who scored 572 points in 94 appearances for the Pride, retired along with former North Queensland Cowboys star Rod Jensen, who scored 36 tries in 69 games for the club, second on the Pride's all-time try scorer list.

2012 season Video Highlights.

2012 Ladder

2013 – Minor Premiers

Former Super League player Jason Demetriou replaced David Maiden as coach, and Brock Schaefer replaced Chris Sheppard as CEO. The Pride finished first and won their first minor premiership. Head Coach Jason Demetriou was awarded the Men of League Coach of the Year. The Pride lost the major semi-final and the preliminary final, and missed out on a Grand Final appearance. At the end of the season Captain Ty Williams retired.

2013 Ladder

2014 – Minor Premiers, Premiers and NRL State Champions

Coach Jason Demetriou named Brett Anderson and Jason Roos as joint co-captains. Barlow Park was renamed 'The Jungle' and the Pride introduced a new mascot, Barlow the lion. The Pride won 20 of their 24 games (including all 12 home games at Barlow Park) and they took out the minor premiership for the second year in a row. The Pride won the grand final 36-4 against Easts Tigers and won the inaugural NRL State Championship against the New South Wales Cup premiers, Penrith Panthers. At the end of the season four of the Pride's players were offered NRL contracts and Demetriou left to take up the role of assistant coach at the North Queensland Cowboys.

2014 Ladder

2015 season

The Northern Pride defended their premiership under new coach Joe O'Callaghan. This was the inaugural season of the Townsville Blackhawks in the Queensland Cup, who became the third feeder club of the North Queensland Cowboys. The Pride were eliminated 54-26 in the first week of the finals by the Ipswich Jets, who would go on to win the Queensland Cup.

2015 Ladder

2016 season

2016 Ladder

2017 season

Ty Williams succeeded Joe O'Callaghan as coach.

2017 Ladder

2018 season

The Northern Pride made the finals of the Queensland Cup for the first time since 2015, but were eliminated by the Easts Tigers 0–28. This game was played at Stan Williams Park, the home of Cairns Brothers due to the unavailability of Barlow Park.

2018 Ladder

2019 season
The Northern Pride lost ten consecutive games during the season, a club record.

2019 Ladder

2020 season 
The season was cancelled on 27 March 2020 due to the COVID-19 pandemic.

2020 Ladder

2021 season 

The 2021 Queensland Cup season is the 26th season of Queensland's top-level statewide rugby league competition run by the Queensland Rugby League. It will be played over 19 rounds.

2021 Ladder

Team of the Decade, 2008–2017
In 2017, to mark the ten-year anniversary of the Pride the Team of the Decade was selected.

Eligible players had to have played 30 matches for the Pride.
The selection panel was Brett Allen, Rhys O'Neill, Pat Bailey, Greg Dowling, Rob White and Bob Fowler.

The Team was announced at a Gala Anniversary Dinner on 30 June 2017.

 1. Fullback – Chey Bird (2008–2012), Matches: 96 
 2. Wing – Linc Port (2014–2016), Matches: 51 
 3. Centre – Brett Anderson (2008, 2010–2015), Matches: 127
 4. Centre – Ty Williams (2008–2013), Matches: 79
 5. Wing – Hezron Murgha (2008–2015), Matches: 102 
 6. Five-eighth – Chris Sheppard (2008–2010), Matches: 60
 7. Halfback – Sam Obst (2013–2015), Matches: 74
 8. Prop – Ben Laity (2008–2013), Matches: 117
 9. Hooker – Jason Roos (2008–2015), Matches: 164 
 10. Prop – Alex Starmer (2008–2015), Matches: 120 
 11. Second row – Mark Cantoni (2008–2011), Matches: 89
 12. Second row – Ben Spina (2010–2017), Matches: 140
 13. Lock – Joel Riethmuller (2008–2014, 2017), Matches: 108
Interchange:
 14. 	Ryan Ghietti (Hooker/Halfback, 2011–present), Matches: 134
 15. 	Davin Crampton (Centre/Second row, 2011–2014), Matches: 75 
 16. 	Blake Leary (Second row, 2011–2014), Matches: 64
 17. 	Luke Harlen (Prop, 2008–09, 2011–12), Matches: 48
Coach of the Decade: 
 Jason Demetriou.

Club records
 Most appearances: Jason Roos, 163 (2008–2015).
 Most points scored for the club: Chey Bird, 574 points (23 tries, 226 goals).
 Most points scored in a season: Chey Bird, 216 points (5 tries, 97 goals) 2011 season; Khan Ahwang 206 points in 23 games in the 2016 season (13 tries, 76 goals).
 Most points in a game: Tom Humble 34 points (4 tries, 9 goals) against Redcliffe Dolphins in Round 18, 2009.
 Most tries scored for the club: Brett Anderson, 61 tries.
 Most tries scored in a season: Linc Port, 26 tries in 25 games in the 2015 season.
 Most tries in a game: 4 tries each by Brett Anderson (2008 v Mackay and again in 2011 v Easts); Tom Humble (2009 v Redcliffe); Linc Port (ROund 25 against CQ Capras in 2015).
 Most goals for the club: Chey Bird, 226 goals.
 Most goals in a season: Chey Bird, 97 goals, 2011 season.
 Most field-goals: Chris Sheppard, 3 field-goals.

Jerseys

Special playing strips
 2010: NAIDOC Week black jersey designed by Kevin Edmondston (Aboriginal) and Joey Laifoo (Torres Strait Islander) and worn in Round 16, Friday 9 July 2010 at Barlow Park for the game against the Ipswich Jets.
 2011: NAIDOC Week green jersey worn in Round 15, Friday 8 July 2011 at Barlow Park for the game against the Burleigh Bears.
 2011: Special NPA (Northern Peninsula Area) indigenous jersey designed by Mario Assan for the Round 20 game played on Saturday 20 August 2011 at Yusia Ginau Oval, Bamaga, Queensland against Souths Logan Magpies. The design incorporates:
The five communities of the NPA Region: Injinoo, Umagico, Bamaga, New Mapoon and Seisia, the communities are represented on the five dots on the boomerang.
The five tribes the Traditional Owners of the NPA Anggamuthi, Atambaya, Wuthati, Yadhaykenu and Gudang. The tribes are depicted through the five rivers that stream from the bottom of the boomerang.
The main centrepiece of the design the Torres Strait Headress (Dhari) traditionally known as a Dhibal, is from Saibai Island, which makes up the majority of the TSI population in the NPA which migrated to the NPA throughout the 1940s. The Dhari as a significant importance in TSI culture, the initiation of young men into warriors, celebrated through dance and ceremonies.
The boomerang represents the Aboriginal peoples of the NPA, used in hunting and gathering and significant ceremonies.
 2012: Pink socks and pink bootlaces for the Breast Cancer Foundation and Women in League Round, Round 15 played on Saturday 23 June 2012 at Barlow Park against Tweed Heads Seagulls.
 2012: Orange jersey for the Round 17 game played on Saturday 14 July 2012 at Alec Inch Oval, Mt Isa against Souths Logan Magpies.

Sponsors
Naming rights sponsor:

 2008–2009: CRGT 
 2010–2013: Skill360
 2014– : Sea Swift

Jersey sponsor (back of jersey):

 Sea Swift (Northern Pride Platinum partner)
 Brothers Leagues Club, Cairns
 Queensland Country Credit Union (Official Health Fund Provider)

Sleeve sponsor:

 2008–2010: NQ X-Ray
 2011–2014: Skytrans
 2014 Finals Series & 2015–: Rivers Insurance Brokers
 2016: Rivers Insurance Brokers & LJ Hooker
Shorts sponsor:

 Brothers Leagues Club, Cairns
 Cairns Regional Council
 Fuller Sports
 Intrust Super
 Cairns Hardware

Playing strip manufacturer:

 EMU Sportswear

Other sponsors: XXXX; Gilligans Backpacker Hotel and Resort; Pacific Toyota; Cairns District Rugby League; Calanna Pharmacy; Tropic Wings; GATA Plastering; All Seasons Cairns Colonial Club; Cairns Plan Printing; Yalumba Winery.
Media partners: Sea FM; Zinc 102.7; WIN Television; Cairns Post.

Players

Northern Pride players

North Queensland Cowboys who played for the Pride

Players who only played pre-season trials

Pride representative players

Northern Pride players who played in the National Rugby League

Pride players who played Super League (Norther Hemisphere)

Pride players who played UK Kingstone Press Championship

Pride players who played English National League

Pride players who played French Elite One Championship

Televised Games

ABC TV
Between 2008 and 2011, Queensland Cup matches were televised by ABC TV, with one match a week shown live across Queensland on ABC1 at 2.00pm (AEST) on Saturday afternoons. The commentary team was Gerry Collins, Warren Boland and David Wright. The Pride had 20 matches televised by the ABC.

Channel Nine
In 2012, the Nine Entertainment Network (Channel 9) got the broadcast rights to the Intrust Super Cup, with one match a week shown live across Queensland on Channel 9 or GEM in south-east Queensland, on WIN Television (RTQ) in regional areas, and on Imparja Television in remote areas. From 2013 matches were also broadcast in Papua New Guinea on Kundu 2 TV.

In August 2012 the Australian Rugby League Commission signed a $1 billion five-year broadcasting agreement with Channel 9 and Fox Sports, which meant that one Intrust Super Cup match would shown each week from 2013 to 2017.
In 2015 the NRL signed a further $1.8 billion five-year broadcasting agreement with Channel 9 and Fox Sports for the 2018 to 2022 seasons.

Between 2012 and 2017, the televised Intrust Super Cup matches were played at 2.00pm (AEST) on Sunday afternoons (except during coverage of the 2012 London Olympics). The 2012 commentary team was Andrew Voss, Ben Ikin and Nick Curry. The 2013 commentary team was Paul Green, Matthew Thompson, Scott Sattler, Adrian Vowles and Peter Psaltis. The 2014/2015 commentary team was Matthew Thompson, Scott Sattler and Peter Psaltis. In 2018, televised Intrust Super Cup matches were rescheduled and played at 1.00pm (AEST) on Saturday afternoons, but this time slot was unpopular and ratings fell. In 2019 televised Intrust Super Cup matches returned to a 2.00pm (AEST) time-slot on Sunday afternoons.

Between 2012 and 2018, the Pride had 29 matches televised by Channel 9, with eight of these matched being home games. The first game broadcast from Barlow Park, Cairns was Round 13, Sunday 10 June 2012 against the Pride's traditional rivals Mackay Cutters.

Live Streaming
From Round 1 2012 the Pride began live streaming their home games free to members via their website ($5 for non-members). From Round 5 2012 away games were streamed through the website as well (Free to members, $5 to non-members). In 2013, all matches (including pre-season trials but excluding matches broadcast live by Channel Nine) were streamed live through the Pride website, with access granted exclusively to Pride members. Video production was by Studio Productions and the commentary team was Adam Jackson and Northern Pride Under-18s coach, Cameron 'Spiller' Miller.

See also

National Rugby League reserves affiliations

References

External links
 Northern Pride – Official site: northernpride.com.au
 Northern Pride – Facebook Page
 Northern Pride – Twitter Page
 Northern Pride – YouTube Page
 2008 Northern Pride photo gallery – Cairns Post
 2009 Northern Pride photo gallery – Cairns Post
 2010 Northern Pride photo gallery – Cairns Post
 2012 Northern Pride match highlights – YouTube

 
Rugby clubs established in 2007
Rugby league teams in Queensland